Ray Smith (June 25, 1918 – December 4, 1979) was an American country music artist.

Born in Glendale, California, Smith began playing guitar at age eight. He joined a traveling rodeo show as a musician, and then took a job performing for radio station WMCA in New York City. He performed locally with a trio in New York, and also worked in Boston on WCOP's Hayloft Jamboree.

While in New York he was offered a contract recording with Columbia Records, and went on to record for London, and Coral as well. He also appeared on Dumont Television.

He died in 1979 at age 61.

References
 Ray Smith at Hillbilly-music.com

1918 births
1979 deaths
Columbia Records artists
American country singer-songwriters
Musicians from Glendale, California
20th-century American singers
Singer-songwriters from California
Country musicians from California